Exotel is a cloud telephony platform that powers communication for enterprises, startups and small and medium enterprises in India and Southeast Asia.

History

Exotel was started by Shivakumar Ganesan, Ishwar Sridharan and Siddharth Ramesh in 2011. Shivakumar's previous venture, Roopit, needed a simple automated call center solution for which he built an in-house software product, and eventually it became a standalone software company in the form of Exotel. Exotel picked up a Rs. 25 million (approximately ) funding from Mumbai Angels and Blume Ventures in March 2012. Witnessing rapid growth, Exotel's annual revenue crossed Rs. 10 million while serving more than 350 clients by June 2013. Exotel currently has over 2500 customers across India and Southeast Asia. The largest competitor to Exotel is TextMagic, Textlocal, as of 2014 and Tecoser as of 2018.

In February 2015, Exotel acquired social media startup Croak.it! in an effort to strengthen its line of products in voice. Exotel is currently handling more than 5 million calls a day with over 18000 companies registered on its site and over 45,000 users.  In March 2016, Exotel set up a research division called Exotel Labs to spur innovation in voice space.

Despite profitability and growing client-base, the company has failed to raise any subsequent rounds of funding since 2011 from institutional investors. In 2016, the company reported revenue of ₹450,000,000 on course for revenue of ₹600,000,000 for the following year.

Products and services

Exotel provides small and medium enterprises, startups and some of the best known businesses in India and Southeast Asia products like Number masking, Lead Assist, Virtual numbers, IVR, SMS, Call Recording Software, and other applications around cloud telephony. They also provide API to developers and technology teams to build 3rd party applications for businesses.

See also
 Twilio

References

External links 
Exotel website

Companies based in Bangalore
Internet technology companies of India
VoIP companies
Telecommunications companies of India
Cloud communication platforms
Indian companies established in 2011
2011 establishments in Karnataka
 Telecommunications companies established in 2011